Froxfield is a small hamlet in Bedfordshire, England.

References

Hamlets in Bedfordshire
Central Bedfordshire District